Mount Ma'okil is a mountain at the border of Batu Pahat District and Muar District in Johor, Malaysia.

See also
 Geography of Malaysia

Batu Pahat District
Ma'okil
Muar District